Many Shades of Blue is an album by American trumpeter Blue Mitchell released on the Mainstream label in 1974.

Reception
The Allmusic review awarded the album 2 stars.

Track listing
All compositions by David Matthews
 "Where It's At" - 3:30
 "Harmony of the Underworld" - 5:50
 "Funky Walk" - 4:36
 "Blue Funk" - 4:37
 "Golden Feathered Bird" - 4:04
 "Beans and Taters" - 4:25
 "Funny Bone" - 3:37
 "Hot Stuff" - 3:55

Personnel
Blue Mitchell, Jim Bossy, Jon Faddis, Marky Markowitz - trumpet
Joe Farrell - flute, tenor saxophone
Seldon Powell - tenor saxophone, baritone saxophone
Frank Vicari - tenor saxophone
Joe Beck, John Tropea - guitar, acoustic guitar
Sam Brown - acoustic guitar
Wilbur Bascomb, Michael Moore - electric bass
Jimmy Madison - drums 
David Matthews - arranger and conductor

References

Mainstream Records albums
Blue Mitchell albums
1974 albums
Albums produced by Bob Shad